Justice Dunn may refer to:

Charles Dunn (Wisconsin politician) (1799–1872), chief justice of the Wisconsin Territorial Supreme Court
Charles J. Dunn (1872–1939), associate justice and chief justice of the Maine Supreme Judicial Court
Francis G. Dunn (fl. 1930s–1980s), associate justice of the South Dakota Supreme Court
Frank K. Dunn (1854–1940), associate justice of the Illinois Supreme Court
Robert N. Dunn (1857–1925), associate justice of the Idaho Supreme Court